Máximo Rigondeaux (born 17 October 1976) is a retired Cuban javelin thrower.

He claimed the silver medal behind compatriot Emeterio González at the 1999 Pan American Games in Winnipeg, Manitoba, Canada. His personal best throw was 81.43 metres, achieved in May 2000 in Dessau.

Achievements

References

1976 births
Living people
Cuban male javelin throwers
Athletes (track and field) at the 1999 Pan American Games
Pan American Games silver medalists for Cuba
Pan American Games medalists in athletics (track and field)
Medalists at the 1999 Pan American Games